Köppen is a German surname. Notable people with the surname include:

 Bernd Köppen (born 1951), German pianist and composer
 Carl Köppen (1833-1907), German military advisor in Meiji era Japan 
 Edlef Köppen (1893–1939), German author and radio editor
 Friedrich Köppen (1775–1858), German philosopher
 Jan Köppen (born 1983), German television presenter and DJ
 Jens Köppen (born 1966), German rower
 Karl Friedrich Köppen (1808–1863), German teacher and political journalist
 Kerstin Köppen (born 1967), German rower
 Wladimir Köppen (1846–1940), German geographer, meteorologist, climatologist and botanist who developed the Köppen climate classification
 Köppen climate classification, developed by Wladimir Köppen

See also
 Lene Køppen (born 1953), Danish badminton player
 Koeppen
 Koppen

German-language surnames